Alsim Leonidovich Chernoskulov (born 11 May 1983) is a Russian sambist and judoka. He is a sixfold World Champion in sambo. He is also a ninefold Russian National Champion.

Alsim's father Leonid enjoyed Vasily Zhukovsky's ballade "Alina and Alsim" and so named his daughter and son after the personages.

He was awarded the Medal of the Order "For Merit to the Fatherland", II grade, on 2 July 2015.

References

1983 births
Living people
Sportspeople from Kurgan Oblast
Russian sambo practitioners
Russian male judoka
Sambo practitioners at the 2015 European Games
Sambo practitioners at the 2019 European Games
European Games gold medalists for Russia
European Games bronze medalists for Russia
European Games medalists in sambo
20th-century Russian people
21st-century Russian people